Miguel Jones Castillo (27 October 1938 – 8 April 2020) was a Spanish footballer who played as a midfielder for SD Indautxu and Atlético Madrid during the 1950s and 1960s.

Football career
Although born in Spanish Guinea, now known as Equatorial Guinea, Jones grew up in Bilbao. He began his career with local sides Barakaldo and Indautxu, where his teammates included the veteran Lezama and another emerging young player, Chus Pereda. Jones and Pereda, and later a third Indautxu player, José Eulogio Gárate, were all controversially rejected by Athletic Bilbao because the club's signing policy required for them to be born in Biscay; he maintained throughout his life that his rejection was not due to racism, as the other shunned players were white.

Jones eventually joined Atlético Madrid where under coach José Villalonga he was a prominent member of an Atlético team that also included Enrique Collar and Adelardo. He played in two successive Copa del Generalísimo finals for Atlético against Real Madrid in 1960 and 1961. Atlético won on both occasions and in the 1960 final Jones scored the opening goal in a 3–1 victory. He made a third appearance in a Copa final in 1964 as Atlético lost 2–1 to Zaragoza. Jones also played for Atlético in two successive European Cup Winners Cup finals in 1962 and 1963. He scored again in the 1962 final as Atlético beat Fiorentina 3–0 after a replay but finished on the losing side when they lost 5–1 to Tottenham Hotspur in 1963. He also won a La Liga title with Atlético in 1966.

In October 1967, Jones was signed for a season with Osasuna, his last club.

Later life
After retiring as a player he returned to live in Bilbao and served as a director at SD Indautxu. Jones was a teammate and friend of Luis Aragonés; when the Spain manager was accused of racism in 2004, he cited his friendship with Jones as proof that he was not.

Jones died on 8 April 2020 at the age of 81. He had cancer for a long period before dying in Bilbao during the coronavirus pandemic.

Honours

Spanish Champions: 1
 1966
Copa del Generalísimo: 3
 1960, 1961, 1965
European Cup Winners Cup:  1
 1962

References

External links

La Liga stats
 Voluntad de tradición, an article on Athletic Bilbao cantera policy in Spanish.

1938 births
2020 deaths
Sportspeople from Malabo
Fernandino people
Spanish sportspeople of Equatoguinean descent
Spanish footballers
Footballers from Bilbao
Barakaldo CF footballers
La Liga players
Segunda División players
Atlético Madrid footballers
CA Osasuna players
SD Indautxu footballers
Association football midfielders
Equatoguinean footballers
Deaths from the COVID-19 pandemic in Spain